Qalanj Lanmesh (also Romanized as Qalanj Lānmesh; also known as Qelīnj Lānmīsh and Qeysh Lānmīsh) is a village in Zangebar Rural District, in the Central District of Poldasht County, West Azerbaijan Province, Iran. At the 2006 census, its population was 855, in 183 families.

References 

Populated places in Poldasht County